M.I. Kesari became the fourth Bishop of Kanyakumari of the Church of South India (CSI) in 1997 and served until 2001.

References

Living people
Year of birth missing (living people)
Moderators of the Church of South India
Anglican bishops of Kanyakumari
Place of birth missing (living people)